Ferenc Habony (born 26 February 1945) is a former Hungarian cyclist. He competed in the 1000m time trial, men's sprint and men's tandem events at the 1964 Summer Olympics.

References

1945 births
Living people
Hungarian male cyclists
Olympic cyclists of Hungary
Cyclists at the 1964 Summer Olympics
Cyclists from Budapest